Dublin Walker (often noted as Dublin I. Walker or Dublin J. Walker) was an African-American State Senator in South Carolina. A Republican, he represented Chester County, South Carolina from 1874 to 1877 and also served as the county's school commissioner.

Walker was arrested on April 23, 1877, charged with grand larceny and jailed by the resurgent Democratic Party known as the (Redeemers). He was therefore unable to take his seat in the Senate and resigned three days later on the 26th.

In November 1875 Governor Daniel Henry Chamberlain (R) pardoned Walker who had been convicted of conspiracy to cheat and defraud.

See also
African-American officeholders during and following the Reconstruction era

References

Date of birth missing
Date of death missing
19th-century American politicians
African-American politicians during the Reconstruction Era
South Carolina Republicans
South Carolina politicians convicted of crimes
Recipients of American gubernatorial pardons
People from Chester County, South Carolina
County officials in South Carolina
School board members in South Carolina
African-American state legislators in South Carolina